(born 18 May 1983) is a track cyclist from Japan. He won a bronze medal in the Keirin race at the 2008 Olympic Games.

References
Profile on Yahoo sports

Japanese male cyclists
Cyclists at the 2008 Summer Olympics
Olympic cyclists of Japan
Olympic bronze medalists for Japan
1983 births
Living people
Olympic medalists in cycling
Medalists at the 2008 Summer Olympics
Keirin cyclists